Vallecito Dam (National ID # CO01695) is a dam in La Plata County, Colorado about  northeast of Durango.

Trees were cleared for the reservoir by the Civilian Conservation Corps. It impounds the Los Pinos River for irrigation water storage. The dam is owned by the Bureau and is operated by the local Pine River Irrigation District.

Recreational opportunities include fishing, hunting, boating, camping and hiking.

References

External links 
 Online recreation page
 

Dams in Colorado
Reservoirs in Colorado
United States Bureau of Reclamation dams
Buildings and structures in La Plata County, Colorado
Dams completed in 1940
Dams in the Colorado River basin
Bodies of water of La Plata County, Colorado